The Bishop of Port Harcourt is the Ordinary of the Roman Catholic Diocese of Port Harcourt in the Ecclesiastical province of Calabar, Nigeria.

The diocese covers an area of 21,850 km2 (8,440 square miles).  The Episcopal see is in Port Harcourt where the bishop's seat (cathedra) is located at the Corpus Christi Cathedral, D-line. The current bishop is the Most Reverend Camillus Archibong Etokudoh, the third Bishop of Port Harcourt.

List of the Bishops of Port Harcourt

See also

List of Roman Catholic churches in Port Harcourt
Roman Catholicism in Nigeria

References

External links
 Diocese of Port Harcourt

 
Port Harcourt-related lists